Statistics of Ekstraklasa for the 1987–88 season.

Overview
It was contested by 16 teams, and Górnik Zabrze won the championship.

League table

Results

Relegation playoffs
The matches were played on 25 and 28 June 1988.

Top goalscorers

References

External links
 Poland – List of final tables at RSSSF 

Ekstraklasa seasons
1987–88 in Polish football
Pol